This is a list of radio stations in Malaysia, ordered by location and frequency. Frequency varies in different states.

There are a total of 24 private and 44 government-owned radio stations in Malaysia. Stations owned by the government operate under the Radio Televisyen Malaysia (RTM) group. Other stations such as BBC World Service, China Radio International and Voice of Vietnam are available in Malaysia via AM.

Stations

FM stations

Amplitude Modulation (AM) stations
Malaysia does not own any AM stations. All of the AM stations able to be received in Malaysia are from other Asian countries with high power transmitters. Reception is much better at night.

Stations (other states)

International radio stations (Defunct)

Defunct radio stations

Notes

References

 
Malaysia